A Wisconsin state forest is an area of forest in the U.S. state of Wisconsin managed by the Wisconsin Department of Natural Resources's Division of Forestry.  They are managed for outdoor recreation, watershed and habitat preservation, and sustainable forestry.  The various units total 471,329 acres (1,907 km2), although many contain extensive private inholdings.  Wisconsin's state forests are often co-listed with Wisconsin's state park system, which is maintained by the Division of Parks and Recreation.

See also
 List of Wisconsin state parks
 List of U.S. National Forests

References

External links
 Wisconsin State Forests

 
Wisconsin
State forests